Tidjani Serpos is a compound surname. Notable people with the surname include:

Ismaël Tidjani Serpos, Beninese politician
Nouréini Tidjani-Serpos (born 1946), Beninese professor of African literature

Compound surnames